Customer acquisition management is a set of techniques used to manage customer prospects and inquiries generated by marketing. Customer acquisition management can be considered the connection between advertising and customer relationship management to acquire new customers.

Customer acquisition management has similarities to lead management. Sometimes missing from lead management definitions, but always included in customer acquisition management, is a closed-loop reporting system. Such a reporting system typically allows the organization to quantify the effectiveness of results of various promotional activities. This allows organizations to realize continuous improvements in both promotional activities and customer acquisition systems. Like lead management, customer acquisition management creates an orderly architecture for managing large volumes of customer inquiries, or leads.

See also
Lead management
Customer relationship management
Business intelligence
Marketing
Customer retention

References

Acquisition